Beacon Rock State Park is a geologic preserve and public recreation area on Route 14 in the Columbia River Gorge National Scenic Area in Skamania County, Washington, United States. On October 31, 1805, the Lewis and Clark Expedition arrived here and first measured tides on the river, indicating that they were nearing the ocean.

Beacon Rock

Beacon Rock is an  monolith composed of basalt on the north bank of the Columbia River. It was named by Lewis and Clark in 1805; they originally referred to it as Beaten Rock, later as Beacon Rock. They noted that the rock marked the eastern extent of the tidal influence in the Columbia. The rock was later known as Castle Rock, until 1915 when its name was changed back to Beacon Rock.

Henry J. Biddle purchased the rock in 1915 for $1 and during the next three years constructed a trail with 51 switchbacks, handrails and bridges. The three-quarter mile trail to the top, completed in April 1918, leads to views in all directions.

The United States Army Corps of Engineers planned to destroy the rock to supply material for the jetty at the mouth of the Columbia (see Columbia River Bar), and dug three caves on the rock's south side. During this time, Biddle's family tried to make it a state park. At first Washington refused the gift, but changed its position when Oregon offered to accept. The park was established in 1935. Workers with the Civilian Conservation Corps made improvements which remain in use.

Claims
Beacon Rock has been variously claimed to be the second largest free standing monolith in the northern hemisphere, or in the world, just behind the Rock of Gibraltar, Stone Mountain, or Mount Augustus, the latter two being very much larger than either of the first two. The assertion depends on how one defines the term "monolith." For example, Devils Tower National Monument in Wyoming is larger than Beacon Rock, but is considered an igneous intrusion rather than necessarily a "single rock."

Activities and amenities

Beacon Rock is known for quality, challenging, technical rock climbing. The park has boating and camping facilities. Trails go to the top of Beacon Rock and Little Beacon Rock. Hardy Falls and Rodney Falls (Pool of the Winds) are scenic highlights along the trail to the summit of  Hamilton Mountain, which has a view of Bonneville Dam and points east. Hamilton Mountain Saddle, located north of the summit, provides additional views, including Table Mountain, and the opportunity for a  loop hike.

Sources

References

External links

Beacon Rock State Park Washington State Parks and Recreation Commission 
Beacon Rock State Park Map Washington State Parks and Recreation Commission

Climbing areas of the United States
Columbia River Gorge
Parks in Skamania County, Washington
State parks of Washington (state)
1935 establishments in Washington (state)
Landforms of Skamania County, Washington
Civilian Conservation Corps in Washington (state)
Protected areas established in 1935